This page lists types of education by subject.

Arts and humanities 
 Classics education
 Fine arts
 Art education
 Dance education
 Music education
 Performing arts education
 Language education
 Literacy education
 Second-language education
 Philosophy education
 Religious education

Business and commerce 
 Business education
 Economics education
 Management education

Science, Technology, Engineering and Mathematics (STEM) 
 Chemistry education
 Computer science education
 Engineering education
 Environmental education
 Mathematics education
 Physics education
 Science education

Social sciences 
 Civics education
 Cultural studies
 Human rights education
 International studies
 Journalism education
 Peace education
 Sex education
 Relationship education

Health oriented education 
 Physical education
 Health education
 Medical education
 Nurse education

Occupational and practically oriented educations 
 Agricultural education
 Career and technical education
 Legal education
 Maritime education
 Military education and training
 Teacher education
 Veterinary education
 Vocational education

See also
 Outline of education

 
 Subject